Sarah Brown (née Bowman - born October 15, 1986)  is a professional American middle distance runner.

High school career
Brown attended Fauquier High School in Warrenton, Virginia. She held the high school record in the mile. Sarah Bowman's 4:36.95 earned a gold medal in the mile 2005 Nike Outdoor Nationals with a time ahead of Brianna Felnagle 4:39.71.

College career
Brown was a nine time All-American and four time NCAA champion for the University of Tennessee.

International career
At the 2010 World Indoor Championships in Athletics Sarah placed 8th in the 1500 meters.
At the 2013 World Championships in Athletics she was a semi-finalist in the 1500 meters.

At the 2015 New Balance Indoor Grand Prix Brown helped set an indoor world record in the distance medley relay.

Sponsorship
Brown runs for Team New Balance.

References

External links
 

1986 births
Living people
Sportspeople from Virginia
American female middle-distance runners
World Athletics Championships athletes for the United States
Tennessee Volunteers women's track and field athletes
Fauquier High School alumni